Charles Peryman (20 January 1872 – 30 August 1950) was an Australian cricketer. He played three first-class cricket matches for Victoria between 1895 and 1896.

He played for the Melbourne Cricket Club in the 1890s in the First XI and remained a member of the club after his playing days. He began working as a coach at the St. Kilda Cricket Club in the 1920s and continued at the club into the mid-1930s. In his career he worked for W. H. Peryman and Co. estate agents. In 1934 he was elected as a churchwarden of Christ Church in St. Kilda.

See also
 List of Victoria first-class cricketers

References

External links
 

1872 births
1950 deaths
Australian cricketers
Victoria cricketers
Cricketers from Melbourne